Fausto Poli (17 February 1581 – 7 October 1653) was a Roman Catholic prelate and Cardinal.

Biography

Born in Usigni in Umbria, as a young man he went to Rome and was soon noticed by Maffeo Barberini, a cleric of the Apostolic Chamber and a fellow Umbrian from nearby Spoleto, soon to become Pope under the name of Urban VIII. In 1632 he was made Majordomo and Prefect of the Lateran palace, in which posts he was responsible for supervising church and court ceremonies. On 25 Jul 1633, he was consecrated Titular Archbishop of Amasia in partibus by Antonio Marcello Barberini (seniore), Cardinal-Priest of Sant'Onofrio, with Giovanni della Robbia, Bishop of Bertinoro, and Benedetto Landi, Bishop Emeritus of Fossombrone, serving as co-consecrators.

As private secretary to Pope Urban, among his most valuable services was that of purchasing old works of art, or commissioning new works, for that inveterate collector; among the artists he encouraged was Claude Lorrain. He was rewarded toward the end of Urban's pontificate by being raised to the purple as Cardinal-Priest of San Crisogono on 31 August 1643. He was appointed Bishop of Orvieto in 1644.

He participated in the Papal conclave of 1644 which elected Urban's successor, Pope Innocent X.

Saint Rita

Throughout his life, he remained very devoted to his home town and region. In addition to beautifying Usigni, he was instrumental in developing iron mines in the area, and he was also so greatly devoted to Rita of Cascia (beatified by Urban in 1627), adorning her church in that town and promoting her cult, that he is often considered to have been the main force in establishing her present cult and popularity. The second edition (1652) of Girolamo de Ghetti's Breve Racconto della Vita e Miracoli della B. Rita da Cascia is dedicated to him.

Death and burial

Poli died in Orvieto in 1653; he was buried according to his wishes in the Chapel of the Guardian Angel in his titular church of San Crisogono.

References

External links
The Usigni pages of Thayer's Gazetteer of Umbria contain further information on Cardinal Poli
Tomb and bust in S. Crisogono

17th-century Italian cardinals
Cardinals created by Pope Urban VIII
Bishops of Orvieto
1581 births
1653 deaths
Italian art collectors
People from the Province of Perugia
17th-century Italian Roman Catholic archbishops